Ungmenna- og íþróttafélagið Smári, Varmahlíð, commonly known as Smári or  Smári Varmahlíð, is a multi-sport club in Varmahlíð, Iceland. It fields departments in basketball, football, and track and field.

Basketball

Men's basketball

Notable players

References

External links
 KKÍ: Smári - kki.is

Basketball teams in Iceland